Yasmine Mansouri (born 15 May 2001) is a French tennis player.

Mansouri has a career-high singles ranking by the WTA of 467, achieved on 6 February 2023. She also has a career-high WTA doubles ranking of 485, achieved on 7 November 2022.

Mansouri made her WTA Tour main-draw debut at the 2022 Jasmin Open in the singles and doubles draws (partnering Inès Ibbou).

ITF finals

Singles: 5 (1 title, 4 runner–ups)

References

External links
 
 

2001 births
Living people
French female tennis players
French people of Tunisian descent